Elizabeth Ilive (or Iliffe; c.1769 – 30 December 1822) was an English polymath. She was the mistress and later wife of George Wyndham, 3rd Earl of Egremont. She was the mother of eight of his children.

Elizabeth Ilive came from Oxford and her father may have been a printer and/or a master at Westminster School. She became Wyndham's mistress in 1785. They were married in 1801, but only one of their children, a daughter who died in infancy in 1803, was born in wedlock. Soon afterwards, the couple separated. 

The children born to the couple prior to their marriage were:
Colonel George Wyndham, 1st Baron Leconfield (1787–1869); George inherited his father's unentailed estates, including Petworth House in Sussex, Leconfield Castle in Yorkshire and Egremont Castle in Cumbria, in preference to the earl's nephew George Wyndham, 4th Earl of Egremont, who inherited the title. Colonel Wyndham was created Baron Leconfield in 1859. He married Mary Fanny Blunt, and had children, including Henry Wyndham, 2nd Baron Leconfield.
Frances Wyndham (1789–1848), who married Sir Charles Burrell, 3rd Baronet, and had children.
General Sir Henry Wyndham (1790–1860), who married Elizabeth Somerset but had no children.
Edward Wyndham (1792–1792)
William Wyndham (1793–1794)
Charlotte Henrietta Wyndham (1795–1870), who married John James King, the son of John King, and had children.
Colonel Charles Wyndham (1796–1866), who married Elizabeth Anne Hepburne-Scott, daughter of Lord Polwarth, but had no children.

Scientific interests
In 1798, Elizabeth Ilive submitted to the Royal Society of Arts the design for a "cross-bar lever" that she had invented, for the purpose of lifting stones. This resulted in the award of a silver medal to the future countess. A portrait of Elizabeth, by Thomas Phillips, RA, is held at her former home, Petworth House. It depicts Elizabeth with a diagram of her invention.

Art
The artist William Blake lived near Petworth for a while, and Elizabeth is thought to have commissioned several works from him. The unnamed woman in Blake's Vision of the Last Judgment is believed to represent her.

Her husband, the earl, was a patron of J. M. W. Turner, and Elizabeth is believed to have assisted Turner with the creation of pigments in her own "laboratory". Evidence for this includes the existence of receipts for artists’ supplies, glass and earthenware retorts, imploding bottles, Magdeburg hemispheres, and yellow powder.

References

1760s births
1822 deaths
Egremont
Women inventors